Agriș is a commune located in Satu Mare County, Romania. It is composed of two villages, Agriș and Ciuperceni (Gombástanya). Formerly part of Botiz Commune, the villages were split off in 2004 to form the separate commune of Agriș.

References

Communes in Satu Mare County